Savandurga  is a hill 60 km west of Bengaluru (Karnataka, India), off the Magadi road in India. It is one of the largest monolith hills in India. The hill rises to 1226 m above mean sea level and forms a part of the Deccan plateau. It consists of peninsular gneiss, granites, basic dykes, and laterites. The Arkavathi river passes nearby through the Thippagondanahalli reservoir and towards Manchanabele dam.

The Savandurga hills are frequented by pilgrims who come to visit the Savandi Veerabhadreshwara Swamy and Narasimha Swamy temple situated at the foothills. Rock climbers, cave explorers, and adventurers are among others who frequent the locale. Nearby Manchanabele Dam is often visited by water-sports enthusiasts.

Origin of name
Savandurga is formed by two hills locally known as Karigudda (black hill) and Biligudda (white hill). The earliest record of the name of the hill is from 1340 AD by Hoysala Ballala III from Madabalu where it is called Savandi. Another view is that the name originates from Samantadurga, attributed to a Samantharaya, a governor under Ahchutaraya at Magadi, although there is no inscription confirming this. This was the secondary capital of the Magadi rulers such as Kempegowda. From 1638 to 1728, Mysore took over Savandurga, with the Dalavayi Devaraja controlling it from the palace at Nelapattana. In 1791 Lord Cornwallis captured it from Tipu Sultan's forces during the Third Anglo-Mysore War. Robert Home in his Select views in Mysore (1794) shows distant views of the hill from Bangalore. He called it Savinadurga or the fort of death. There were no steps to reach the hill top and it was covered by bamboos and other trees forming a barricade.

Megalithic burial urns have been found in the area. Saavana in Sanskrit also means three time rituals.

The principal local deity is Sri Savandi Veerabhadraswamy Virabhadra, a temple to whom is situated at the foot of the Savandurga hill. The lord Veerabhadraswamy has followers across the south Karnataka districts like Bangalore, Ramanagara, Tumkur and Mysore.

There is a Temple of Sri Lakshmi Narasimha Swamy, where there is an Idol of Lord Narasimha has been worshiped for many generations.

Climbing

There are a dozen routes, bolted or otherwise on the south face of the monolith. Most of these routes can be completed in half a day to a day, depending on various factors.  Some of the routes have long runouts, and most of them face South or are exposed to South-east, suggesting that when the sun comes up, the rock becomes quite hot.

Fauna

The hills are home to the endangered yellow-throated bulbuls and were once home to long-billed vultures and white-backed vultures. Other wildlife includes sloth bear and leopard.

Flora
Surrounding the area is a state forest with scrub and dry deciduous forest covering 27 km. The degraded forest, which is considered as shrub and tree savanna of the Anogeissus–Chloroxylon–Acacia series is highly diverse, recording over 59 tree and 119 shrub species.

References

External links

 Bird's eye view of Savandurga
 http://www.mapability.com/travel/p2i/marabar_2.html
 Economically important flora of the region

Bornhardts
Tourist attractions in Bangalore
Hills of Karnataka
Forts in Karnataka
Buildings and structures in Ramanagara district
Monoliths
Geography of Ramanagara district
Inselbergs of Asia
Climbing areas of India